The Magic Flute of Herbie Mann is an album by American jazz flautist Herbie Mann recorded in 1957 for the Verve label.

Reception

Allmusic awarded the album 3 stars.

Track listing
 "Evolution of Man(n)" (Herbie Mann) - 4:07
 "Moonlight Serenade" (Glenn Miller, Mitchell Parish) - 2:55
 "St. Louis Blues" (W. C. Handy) - 3:59
 "Baia" (Ary Barroso, Ray Gilbert) - 2:49
 "Body and Soul" (Frank Eyton, Johnny Green, Edward Heyman, Robert Sour) - 2:57
 "Let's Dance" (Fannie Baldridge, Joseph Bonine, Gregory Stone) - 2:24
 "Frenesí" (Alberto Domínguez, Leonard Whitcup) - 2:27 
 "Oodles of Noodles" (Jimmy Dorsey) - 2:58
 "Tenderly" (Walter Gross, Jack Lawrence) - 4:02
 "Peanut Vendor" (Moisés Simons) - 2:03
 "Stardust" (Hoagy Carmichael, Mitchell Parish) - 2:56
 "Strike Up the Band" (George Gershwin, Ira Gershwin) - 2:04

Personnel 
Herbie Mann - flute
Jimmy Rowles - piano (tracks 2, 3, 5, 6, 8, 9, 11 & 12)
Laurindo Almeida (tracks 1, 4, 7 & 10), Tony Rizzi (tracks 1, 4, 7 & 10), Howard Roberts (tracks 2, 5, 8 & 11) - guitar
Buddy Clark (tracks 2, 3, 5, 6, 8, 9, 11 & 12), Tony Reyes (tracks 1, 4, 7 & 10) - bass 
Milt Holland (tracks 1, 4, 7 & 10), Mel Lewis (tracks 2, 3, 5, 6, 8, 9, 11 & 12) - drums
Frank "Chico" Guerrero - congas (tracks 1, 4, 7 & 10)
Unidentified string section directed by Frank De Vol (tracks 2, 5, 8 & 11)

References 

1957 albums
Herbie Mann albums
Albums produced by Norman Granz
Verve Records albums